Berchtesgaden Provostry or the Prince-Provostry of Berchtesgaden was an immediate principality of the Holy Roman Empire, held by a canonry (a collegiate foundation of Canons Regular) led by a Prince-Provost.

Geography
The territory comprised the Alpine Berchtesgaden hollow, namely the modern communities of Berchtesgaden, Bischofswiesen, Marktschellenberg, Ramsau and Schönau am Königssee, located in the present-day German state of Bavaria, as well as a number of estates further afield. 

The location of the monastery was strategically important. Firstly, it is in an area possessing immensely valuable salt deposits, and was situated in such a way that it was able to act as a buffer state between its much larger neighbours, the Duchy of Bavaria and the Archbishopric of Salzburg, and to make this situation work to its advantage. Secondly, the Berchtesgaden valley is almost entirely enclosed by high mountains, except for a single point of access to the north, and is thus virtually impregnable.

History
The Berchtesgaden monastery, dedicated to Saint Peter and Saint John the Baptist, was founded in 1102 within the Bavarian stem duchy as a community of Augustinian Canons by Count Berengar of Sulzbach under the directions of the will of his mother, the late Countess Irmgard.

In view of the favourable geopolitical circumstances, the provosts had little difficulty in establishing the territorial independence of the monastery, which became an Imperial abbey in 1194. In 1380 the provosts achieved the status of an ecclesiastical Reichsfürst and from 1559 held a direct vote in the Reichstag assembly as "Prince-Provosts", a rank almost equivalent to that of a Prince-Bishop. The title was one of only two within the Empire: the only other one was at the Swabian Imperial Ellwangen Abbey. 

The position of Prince-Provost was frequently held in conjunction with other high ecclesiastical positions, and the provosts often lived elsewhere. From 1594 until 1723, the title and territories were held by the House of Wittelsbach, from 1612 in personal union by the Prince-Archbishops of Cologne, whose cousins ruled over the neighbouring Bavarian duchy. The constant avarice of the archbishops of Salzburg led to clashes of arms in 1611, when the troops of Wolf Dietrich Raitenau occupied Berchtesgaden but were repulsed by the forces of Duke Maximilian I of Bavaria.

In 1802/1803 the provostry and its territories were secularised and mediatised first to the short-lived Electorate of Salzburg, which according to the 1805 Peace of Pressburg fell to the Austrian Empire, and finally in 1810 to the newly established Kingdom of Bavaria. The monastic buildings were used for a while as a barracks, but in 1818 the monastery was designated as a royal residence of the Wittelsbachs, who used it as a summer palace.

Following the end of the Bavarian monarchy, the buildings have been administered since 1923 by the Wittelsbach Compensation Fund (Wittelsbacher Ausgleichsfonds). Some of the rooms are open to the public, while other parts of the building are still used by the Wittelsbachs. The monastic church now serves as the parish church of Berchtesgaden.

Provosts and Prince-Provosts of Berchtesgaden
 Eberwin 1111-1142
 Hugo I 1142-1148
 Heinrich I 1148-1174, Anti-Archbishop of Salzburg 1174-1177, Bishop of Brixen 1177-1195
 Dietrich 1174-1178
 Friedrich I 1178-1188
 Bernhard I of Schönstätten 1188-1201
 Gerhard 1201
 Hugo II 1201-1210
 Konrad Garrer 1210-1211
 Friedrich II Ellinger 1211-1217
 Heinrich II 1217-1231
 Friedrich III of Ortenburg 1231-1239
 Bernhard II 1239-1252
 Konrad II 1252
 Heinrich III 1252-1257
 Konrad III von Medling 1257-1283
 Johann I Sachs von Sachsenau 1283-1303, Prince-Bishop of Brixen 1302-1306
 Hartung von Wildon 1303-1306
 Eberhard Sachs von Sachsenau 1306-1316
 Konrad IV Tanner 1316-1333
 Heinrich IV von Inzing 1333-1351
 Reinhold Zeller 1351-1355
 Otto Tanner 1355-1357
 Peter I Pfaffinger 1357-1362
 Jakob I von Vansdorf 1362-1368
 Greimold Wulp 1368-1377
 Ulrich I Wulp 1377-1384 concurrently with
 Sieghard Waller 1381-1384
 Konrad V Thorer von Thörlein 1384-1393, Bishop of Lavant 1397-1406
 Pilgrim von Puchheim 1393-1396, also Prince-Archbishop of Salzburg since 1365
 Gregorius Schenk von Osterwitz 1396-1403, also Prince-Archbishop of Salzburg
 Berthold von Wehingen 1404, Anti-Archbishop of Salzburg 1404-1406
 Peter II Pienzenauer 1404-1432
 Johann II Praun 1432-1446
 Bernhard III Leuprechtinger 1446-1473
 Erasmus Pretschlaiffer 1473-1486
 Ulrich II Pernauer 1486-1496
 Balthasar Hirschauer 1496-1508
 Gregor Rainer 1508-1522
 Wolfgang I Lenberger 1523-1541
 Wolfgang II Griestätter 1541-1567 (created Prince-Provost in 1559)
 Jakob II Putrich 1567-1594
 Ferdinand of Bavaria 1594-1650, also Archbishop of Cologne from 1612
 Maximilian Heinrich of Bavaria 1650-1688, also Archbishop of Cologne
 Joseph Clemens of Bavaria 1688-1723, also Archbishop of Cologne
 Julius Heinrich von Rehlingen-Radau 1723-1732
 Cajetan Anton von Notthaft 1732-1752
 Michael Balthasar von Christalnigg 1752-1768
 Franz Anton Joseph von Hausen-Gleichenstorff 1768-1780
 Joseph Konrad von Schroffenberg-Mös 1780-1803, also Prince-Bishop of Freising 1789-1803, resigned

See also
Berchtesgadener Land

External links 
  Klöster in Bayern
  Map of Bavaria of 1789 showing the Fürstpropstei

1100s establishments in the Holy Roman Empire
1102 establishments in Europe
Imperial abbeys disestablished in 1802–03
States and territories established in 1102
Augustinian monasteries in Germany
Monasteries in Bavaria
Imperial abbeys
Religious organizations established in the 1100s
Christian monasteries established in the 12th century
Bavarian Circle
Berchtesgadener Land